Patersonia drummondii, commonly known as Drummond's patersonia, is a species of plant in the iris family Iridaceae and is endemic to the south-west of Western Australia. It is a tufted herb with linear, often twisted leaves and pale violet to purple or blue tepals.

Description
Flowering from August to October.

Taxonomy and naming
Patersonia drummondii was first described in 1873 by George Bentham in Flora Australiensis from an unpublished description by Ferdinand von Mueller, from specimens collected by James Drummond in the Swan River Colony. The specific epithet (drummondii) honours James Drummond.

Distribution and habitat
This patersonia grows in heathland and mallee south from the Murchison River and inland as far as Southern Cross in the Avon Wheatbelt, Coolgardie, Geraldton Sandplains, Jarrah Forest, Mallee, Swan Coastal Plain and Yagoo biogeographic regions of south-western Western Australia.

Conservation status
Patersonia drummondii is listed as "not threatened" by the Government of Western Australia Department of Biodiversity, Conservation and Attractions.

References

drummondii
Flora of Western Australia
Plants described in 1873
Taxa named by George Bentham